Capitalist Piglet was a comic strip that appeared briefly in The Sheaf during 2005–2006, and is best known for a controversial installment depicting Jesus Christ performing fellatio on a cartoon pig.

Creation
The strip was a collaboration between cartoonist Mark Watson (aka Marq) and Jeff MacDonald (aka Y!ph) and appeared infrequently in The Sheaf, the University of Saskatchewan students' newspaper.

Controversy

Background
In the February 22, 2006, issue of The Sheaf, pages B1-B4 of the issue were devoted to several lengthy opinion articles and letters addressing the Jyllands-Posten Muhammad cartoons controversy. The Sheaf editor-in-chief, Will Robbins, wrote a 1,000-word editorial prefacing the other opinions outlining the reasons behind The Sheafs editorial decision not to publish any of the controversial cartoons. Robbins also indicated that the decision not to publish any of the cartoons was not unanimous among the editorial staff. Indeed, in response to this decision The Sheaf news editor, Jeremy Warren, resigned from the paper. The nuanced journalistic position Robbins staked for The Sheaf was brought into question just one week later by the appearance of a controversial instalment of the Capitalist Piglet cartoon.

The March 2 issue
In the March 2, 2006, issue of The Sheaf, a two-panel installment of the comic strip appeared in the paper's "Comics and Humour" section depicting a caricature of Jesus performing fellatio on a top-hatted, monocle-wearing "Capitalist Piglet". The second panel includes the pig saying "It's Kosher if you don't swallow."

The comic had been scanned and laid-out into the newspaper's publication software by the graphics editor. The editor-in-chief reviewed the first draft of the paper and marked the Capitalist Piglet comic for deletion from the issue. It is in dispute whether or not he also verbally instructed the graphics editor to remove it or not; regardless the comic was not removed. The issue went through several more revisions before going to print without the offending comic being withdrawn. The editor-in-chief later claimed this was a mistake and due in part to a staff shortage (ostensibly aggravated by the above-mentioned resignation of the news editor).<ref name=Fedio>Chloé Fedio "U of S student paper on defensive after publishing Jesus comic"  The Gateway/University of Alberta, 10 March 2006</ref>

In a retraction posted on page A2 of the March 9, 2006, issue, The Sheaf stated that Mark Watson was not an author of the March 2, 2006, Capitalist Piglet cartoon. In a letter appearing in that same issue, Mark Watson explained that his colleague, Y!ph, added his name to the installment "because he was using my character". In the same issue, Jeff MacDonald accepted full responsibility for authoring the comic.

Public reaction
On March 3, 2006, University of Saskatchewan President Peter MacKinnon distributed an e-mail to all university staff and students calling on The Sheaf to apologize.

The Saskatoon daily newspaper, The StarPhoenix, published several stories about the incident, beginning on March 11, 2006.

Several Rawlco radio stations also picked up the story, in particular its Saskatchewan AM Radio Talk News stations CKOM and CJME. Morning talk-show personality, and former Progressive Conservative Member of Parliament, John Gormley, called on listeners to file a complaint with the Saskatchewan Human Rights Commission.

The comic was reported by other media, including the local CTV station. It gathered national media attention as well, and was heavily debated on many blogs, including the popular Saskatchewan blog Small Dead Animals. Canadian University Press also ran a wire story detailing the situation.Meredith Lilly, "Courting Controversy - Ezra Levant and the Danish cartoons  Canadian Student Review, Spring 2006

Numerous letters, both supporting and attacking The Sheaf were published in its subsequent March 9, 2006, issue on pages A11-A15.

Actions by The Sheaf
Shortly after the March 2 edition came out in print, the "Comics and Humour" section - including the offending comic - was removed from The Sheafs online version.

According to Robbins' comments in a Star Phoenix article, he was invited to a Sunday meeting at The Sheaf and informed that all the other staff and editors had lost confidence in his ability to manage the paper and asked him to resign. Reluctantly Robbins resigned. Despite many letters of support for Robbins, The Sheaf Board of Directors accepted his resignation and appointed the production manager, Liam Richards, interim editor-in-chief and primary spokesperson during the controversy. In a press release, The Sheaf Board of Directors stated that "while the board is of the view that the 'Capitalist Piglet' comic is not consistent with The Sheaf'''s objectives, nor its previous editorial policy, we wish to make clear that our acceptance of his resignation was based primarily on his failure to carry out his duties diligently."

References

Canadian comic strips
Comics critical of religion
2005 comics debuts
2006 comics endings
Obscenity controversies in comics
Religious controversies in comics
Cultural depictions of Jesus
Criticism of Christianity
Pigs in art
Zoophilia in culture